Bela alma is a species of sea snail, a marine gastropod mollusk in the family Mangeliidae.

Description
The length of the pale brown shell attains 7 mm, its diameter 2.5 mm.

Distribution
This marine species occurs off the Agulhas Bank, South Africa.

References

 Thiele, J. 1925. Gastropoda der Deutschen Tiefsee-Expedition, 11. Wiss. Ergebn. dt. Tiefsee Exped. 'Valdivia' 17(2): 37-382

External links
   Bouchet P., Kantor Yu.I., Sysoev A. & Puillandre N. (2011) A new operational classification of the Conoidea. Journal of Molluscan Studies 77: 273-308.
  Barnard K.H. (1958), Contribution to the knowledge of South African marine Mollusca. Part 1. Gastropoda; Prosobranchiata: Toxoglossa; Annals of The South African Museum v. 44 p. 73 - 163
  Tucker, J.K. 2004 Catalog of recent and fossil turrids (Mollusca: Gastropoda). Zootaxa 682:1-1295.

Endemic fauna of South Africa
alma